Alexander Aranburu Deba (born 19 September 1995 in Ezkio-Itsaso) is a Spanish cyclist, who currently rides for UCI WorldTeam . In August 2018, he was named in the startlist for the Vuelta a España.

Major results

2016
 8th Circuito de Getxo
2017
 7th Overall Tour du Gévaudan Languedoc-Roussillon
 9th Trofeo Pollenca–Port de Andratx
2018
 1st Circuito de Getxo
 5th Overall Tour of Norway
 10th Overall Vuelta a Castilla y León
  Combativity award Stage 7 Vuelta a España
2019
 Vuelta a Burgos
1st  Points classification
1st Stage 4
 2nd Circuito de Getxo
 4th Overall Vuelta a la Comunidad de Madrid
1st Stage 2
  Combativity award Stage 11 Vuelta a España
2020
 2nd Gran Trittico Lombardo
 6th Gran Piemonte
 7th Milan–San Remo
2021
 1st Stage 2 Tour of the Basque Country
 3rd Road race, National Road Championships
 3rd Memorial Marco Pantani
 6th Omloop Het Nieuwsblad
 7th Milan–San Remo
2022
 1st  Overall Tour du Limousin
1st Stage 2
 3rd Road race, National Road Championships
 3rd Overall Boucles de la Mayenne
 6th Circuito de Getxo
 6th Giro della Toscana
2023
 9th Overall Volta a la Comunitat Valenciana

Grand Tour general classification results timeline

References

External links

1995 births
Living people
Spanish male cyclists
People from Goierri
Sportspeople from Gipuzkoa
Cyclists from the Basque Country (autonomous community)